Sweetbay Supermarket was a chain of American supermarkets located in Florida. The first Sweetbay Supermarket to open was in Seminole, Florida, in November 2004. The company's headquarters was located near Tampa, in Hillsborough County, Florida. It was a part of the Belgian Delhaize Group. In May 2013, the chain was purchased by BI-LO. On October 8, 2013, BI-LO announced it was retiring the Sweetbay name and all remaining locations would be re-branded as Winn-Dixie.

History

Kash n' Karry

Salvatore Greco, an Italian immigrant, sold fruits and vegetables in the streets of Tampa beginning in 1914. In 1922, he and his wife Giuseppina opened a storefront at their home. The Greco family built a proper store in 1947 under the name Big Barn in Plant City, Florida. The business expanded and they had opened nine stores by 1960 with the name of Tampa Wholesale. In 1962, the name changed again to Kash n' Karry, based on the cash and carry program of World War II. People would bring in their "cash" and "carry" out their own groceries. They left out nonessential parts of supermarkets like contests, customer service representatives, and samples.

Kash n' Karry was acquired by Lucky Stores of California in 1979. After American Stores acquired Lucky in 1988, it sold Kash n' Karry to leveraged buyout firm Gibbons, Green, and van Amerongen. As the buyout was being completed, Kash n' Karry bought 24 Florida Choice supermarkets from Kroger, who was closing the chain. When Gibbons, Green and van Amerongen dissolved, Leonard Green & Partners became the controlling stockholder. Kash n' Karry filed for bankruptcy in 1994.

Kash n' Karry held an IPO in 1995. In December 1996, Kash n' Karry became a wholly-owned subsidiary of Food Lion, the American division of Delhaize Group. In July 2000, after Food Lion's acquisition of Hannaford, the holding company Delhaize America, Inc., was created. As a result, Kash n' Karry became a wholly-owned subsidiary of Delhaize America.

In 2002, Kash n' Karry pulled out of the competitive Orlando market with only two stores remaining in Clermont, Florida; 25 miles west of Orlando.  Two of the chains three stores in Gainesville, Florida were also closed. 

On August 29, 2007, the last Kash n' Karry store in Crystal River, Florida, closed, marking the end of the Kash n' Karry brand and the full conversion to Sweetbay Supermarket.

Sweetbay
In January 2004, after years of slumping sales growth, Kash n' Karry announced the creation and rollout of a new supermarket concept called Sweetbay Supermarket in its core markets on the West Coast of Florida. The first of the new Sweetbay Supermarkets opened in Seminole, Florida, on November 6, 2004, and in Fort Myers in December 2004. By September 2007, all Kash n' Karry stores were redesigned as Sweetbay Supermarkets. 

In 2008, Sweetbay became the official supermarket of the Tampa Bay Rays baseball club.

In January 2013, Sweetbay announced that 33 stores would close, leaving the chain with 72 stores. The closings were attributed to competition from regional grocery chain Publix and national chain Walmart. The closings included the two remaining stores in Clermont, ending the company's presence in the Orlando market.

In May 2013, Sweetbay and its sister supermarket chains Harveys and Reid's were sold to BI-LO LLC for $265 million. Also included in the transaction were leases to 10 Sweetbay locations that closed in January 2013.

On October 8, 2013, BI-LO announced it would retire the Sweetbay brand, and rename all Sweetbay locations to Winn-Dixie. The following month, it was announced that the Tampa headquarters would permanently closed.

Hannaford
When Sweetbay was created, it was modeled after Delhaize's Hannaford brand, incorporating store design, logo/branding elements, and pricing strategy from its northeastern sister company. Additionally, Sweetbay stocked Hannaford-branded products as its generic store brand until 2011, when all Delhaize America stores began offering the Healthy Accents brand (for health & beauty items), the Home 360 brand (for home products) and the My Essentials brand (for food products).

In March 2008, Hannaford Supermarkets announced a data intrusion that resulted in the theft of customer credit and debit card numbers. No personal information, such as names or addresses, was accessed. The intrusion not only affected Hannaford stores, but also Sweetbay stores in Florida, and certain independently owned retail locations in the Northeast that carried Hannaford products. The company was aware of about 1,800 cases of fraud related to the data intrusion and about 4.2 million unique account numbers were exposed.

References

Supermarkets of the United States
Companies based in Tampa, Florida
Retail companies established in 1947
Retail companies disestablished in 2014
Companies that filed for Chapter 11 bankruptcy in 1994
1947 establishments in Florida
2014 disestablishments in Florida
Private equity portfolio companies